Valenciennes station (French: Gare de Valenciennes) is a French railway station serving the town of Valenciennes, Nord, France.

Train services

The station is served by high speed services to Paris and by regional trains to Lille, Douai, Cambrai, Charleville-Mézières and Maubeuge.

See also 

 List of SNCF stations in Hauts-de-France

References

Railway stations in Nord (French department)
Railway stations in France opened in 1909
Buildings and structures in Valenciennes